Béla Pásztor (born 27 February 1938) is a Hungarian politician, who served as Chairman of the Council then Mayor of Veresegyház from 1 September 1965.

Pásztor resigned on 28 February 2023.

References

External links
 varosatyak.hu

1938 births
Living people
Hungarians in Slovakia
Mayors of places in Hungary
People from Veľký Krtíš District